Marguerite Mongenast-Servais  (1885–1925), was a Luxembourg women's rights activist.

She was married to the engineer Paul Mongenast and engaged in several progressive associations, among them the anti-monarchist "Action républicaine". She was also a member of the women's rights organization "Organisation pour les Intérêts de la femme". There was never any organized women suffrage movement in Luxembourg: women suffrage was introduced in 1919 without any debate, as a part of the project of the new democratic constitution, and the women's rights organizations mainly focused on educational opportunities. However, in 1917–1919, Marguerite Thomas-Clement belonged to the few who spoke in favour of women suffrage in public debates through articles in the press.

References
 Baden, Jeff, 2012. Eng aussergewéinlech Fra. D'Marguerite Mongenast-Servais - "eine hochgebildete, energische junge Dame". Virgestallt vum Germaine Goetzinger, Directrice vum CNL. Die Warte 11/2361: 2, 22. Mäerz 2012.

1885 births
1925 deaths
Luxembourgian women's rights activists
Luxembourgian feminists
19th-century Luxembourgian people